Ros Drinkwater (born 14 February 1944) is a Scottish-born actress, best known for her portrayal of Paul Temple's wife, Steve, in the eponymous television series, based on the character created by Francis Durbridge. She later moved into photojournalism.

Ros Drinkwater was born in Glasgow, Scotland on 14 February 1944. Her family was Anglo-Irish and her grandfather had been in the Indian Army.

Drinkwater worked as a dancer in Las Vegas before turning to acting. In the late 1960s, she appeared in a number of episodes of British television series, including Dr Finlay's Casebook ("A Matter of Confidence", 1966), Champion House ("The Saddest Words", 1967), The Saint ("Invitation to Danger", 1968) and Special Branch ("The Kazmirov Affair", 1969). She also appeared briefly in the film Song of Norway (1970) as one of Franz Liszt's friends.

Drinkwater's best known role was as Steve Temple (née Louise Harvey but in the earlier radio serials was a Fleet Street journalist using the name Steve Trent) the wife of writer/detective Paul Temple (Francis Matthews), in Paul Temple (1969–71). This was a co-production by the BBC and Taurus films of Munich, West Germany. According to Matthews, Drinkwater chose her own "very expensive" designer clothes for the part.

Paul Temple lasted for two years and was popular in West Germany. There appears to have been some disagreement between the BBC and Taurus over the casting of Steve Temple (who had been played in the radio series of Paul Temple from 1945-68 by Marjorie Westbury), the BBC wishing to drop Drinkwater, but Taurus favouring her retention.

Drinkwater subsequently became a photojournalist, based in Ireland, where she has a small farm in County Monaghan.

Ros Drinkwater is sometimes referred to as the older sister of actor Carol Drinkwater but the two are not related.

References

External links
 Media Gems: Paul Temple
 Paul Temple - including full list of TV episodes
 Ros Drinkwater - personal photojournalism site

1944 births
Living people
Actresses from Glasgow
British film actresses
British television actresses